The 2013 Palmer Cup was held on June 7–9, 2013 on the South Course at Wilmington Country Club, Wilmington, Delaware. The United States won 20½ to 9½. The teams were increased from 8 to 10.

Format
The order of the sessions was changed. On Friday, there were five matches of four-ball, while there were ten singles matches on Saturday. Five foursomes matches were played on Sunday morning followed by ten singles matches in the afternoon. In all, 30 matches were played.

Each of the 30 matches was worth one point in the larger team competition. If a match was all square after the 18th hole, each side earned half a point toward their team total. The team that accumulated at least 15½ points won the competition.

Teams
Ten college golfers from the United States and Europe participated in the event.

Friday's four-ball matches

Saturday's singles matches

Sunday's matches

Morning foursomes

Afternoon singles

Michael Carter award
The Michael Carter Award winners were James Erkenbeck and Pedro Figueiredo.

References

External links
Palmer Cup official site

Arnold Palmer Cup
Golf in Delaware
Palmer Cup
Palmer Cup
Palmer Cup
Palmer Cup